Sanna Englund (born 18 April 1975 in Heidelberg, Germany) is a German actress and model.

 Englund was single.

Filmography 
 1998: Angel Express
 1999: Himmelskörper
 2000: Leinen los
 2000: Die Cleveren
 2001–2003: Hinter Gittern – Der Frauenknast (episodes 153-245)
 2001: Lätta (TV advertisement)
 2001: Heute ist nicht gestern
 2002: Hallo Robbie!
 2002: Leipzig Homicide – Seitensprung
 2003: Ruhige Lage, nette Aussicht
 2003: Großstadtrevier
 2002: 
 2003: Otto Versand (TV advertisement)
 2003: Berlin, Berlin – Daily Talk
 2003: Die Wache – Zahn um Zahn
 2004–2005: St. Angela (episodes 236-275)
 2005: Abschnitt 40 – Terroristen
 2005: Balko – Totalschaden
 2005: Verliebt in Berlin (episodes 6–10)
 2005: Auftauchen
 2005: Du Darfst (TV advertisement)
 2005: Mörderspiel
 2005: KomA
 2005: Liebesleben – Freier Fall
 2006: Alarm für Cobra 11 – Die Autobahnpolizei – Volles Risiko
 2006: Die Sitte – Schichtwechsel
 2006: Schmetterlinge im Bauch
 2006:  – Unter Brüdern
 2006–2008: Zwei Herzen und zwölf Pfoten
 Seit 2006: Notruf Hafenkante
 2007: R. I. S. – Die Sprache der Toten – Vermisst
 2007: GSG 9 – Ihr Einsatz ist ihr Leben – Ich, der Feind
 2007: Der Kriminalist
 2008: Die Anwälte – Entmündigung
 2009: Der Dicke – Gefährliches Spiel
 2011: Küstenwache – Ein tödliches Spiel
 2011: Alarm für Cobra 11 – Die Autobahnpolizei – Mitten ins Herz
 2013: Der Landarzt – Amtshilfe
 2013: Kripo Holstein – Mord und Meer – Todesengel in Weiß (as Veronica Nater)

References

External links 

 
 Official homepage 
 Sanna Englund at the Agentur LUX

German television actresses
1975 births
Living people
21st-century German actresses